Amankənd (also, Əmənkənd and Armen-Keno) is a village and municipality in the Bilasuvar Rayon of Azerbaijan.  It has a population of 3,245.

References 

Populated places in Bilasuvar District